Ch'ulla Rinri (Quechua ch'ulla unequal, rinri ear, "unequal ear", Hispanicized spelling Chullarinri) is a mountain in the Andes of Peru, about  high. It is located in the Puno Region, Lampa Province, Ocuviri District, and in the Melgar Province, Ayaviri District. Ch'ulla Rinri lies northwest of Achuqallani and north of Warmi Sayana.

The P'allqamayu originates southeast of the mountain. It flows to the north.

References

Mountains of Peru
Mountains of Puno Region